Jay Lender (born June 14, 1969) is an American television writer, storyboard artist and director. He is a former writer and storyboard director for SpongeBob SquarePants. Previous to his work on SpongeBob, Lender designed and drew backgrounds for Nickelodeon's Hey Arnold!. He is the son of the founder of Lender's Bagels, Murray Lender.

Since leaving Nickelodeon, Lender has written scripts for video games with his writing partner Micah Wright, and continues to develop animated series concepts as well as drawing the occasional SpongeBob comic strip for Nickelodeon Magazine. Most recently, the duo worked together on Robocalypse, a real-time strategy game for the Nintendo DS.

Lender spent two years studying at the Rhode Island School of Design before transferring to CalArts where he specialized in animation. Lender has also directed two seasons of Disney Channel's Phineas and Ferb.

Filmography

Film

Television

SpongeBob SquarePants episodes
 "Graveyard Shift"
 "Hall Monitor"
 "Rock-a-Bye Bivalve"
 "Big Pink Loser"
 "Neptune's Spatula"
 "Pressure"
 "Plankton's Army"
 "Mermaid Man and Barnacle Boy IV"
 "Valentines Day"
 "The Paper"
 "Just One Bite"
 "Opposite Day"
 "Mermaid Man and Barnacle Boy II"
 "Bubble Buddy"
 "Patty Hype"
 "Life of Crime"
 "I'm Your Biggest Fanatic"
 "Krusty Love"
 "The Fry Cook Games"
 "Sandy, SpongeBob, and the Worm"
 "SpongeGuard on Duty"
 "Can You Spare a Dime?"
 "Squilliam Returns"
 "Clams"
 "The Camping Episode"
 "The Sponge Who Could Fly"

Bibliography

External links 
 Jay Lender home page
 Evilscum.net
 Micah Wright home page
 Rhode Island School of Design, "RISD"
 California Institute of the Arts, "CalArts"

1969 births
American male screenwriters
American storyboard artists
American television directors
American television writers
California Institute of the Arts alumni
Living people
American male television writers
Rhode Island School of Design alumni
Nickelodeon Animation Studio people